Dennis Bert Claridge (August 18, 1941 – May 1, 2018) was an American football player, a quarterback in the National Football League for the Green Bay Packers and Atlanta Falcons. He played college football at the University of Nebraska under head coaches Bill Jennings and Bob Devaney, and later attended its dental school.

Born in Phoenix, Arizona, Claridge played high school football in Minnesota at Robbinsdale, a suburb northwest of Minneapolis.  As a senior in college in 1963, he led Nebraska to an undefeated season in the Big Eight Conference, a 9–1 regular season, and a victory over Auburn in the Orange Bowl.

Selected in third round of the 1963 NFL draft as a junior eligible, Claridge stayed in college and joined the Packers in 1964. He was a member of the NFL championship team in 1965, playing behind Hall of Fame quarterback Bart Starr and Zeke Bratkowski under head coach Vince Lombardi. Claridge was selected in the 1966 expansion draft by the Falcons. Green Bay was interested in reacquiring him for the 1967 season, but he left the NFL after three seasons to complete dental school.
 
Claridge later worked as an orthodontist in Lincoln, Nebraska. He died in 2018 of bladder cancer at the age of 76.

See also
 Colin Allred - former NFL linebacker who became a lawyer and US Representative
 Tommy Casanova - former NFL player who became an ophthalmologist
 Dan Doornink – former NFL running back who became a medical doctor
 Laurent Duvernay-Tardif – current NFL player who earned a medical degree while playing in the league
 John Frank - Super Bowl winning SF 49er who became a NY City based plastic surgeon
 Joel Makovicka – former NFL fullback who became a doctor of physical therapy
 Bill McColl - former NFL player who became an orthopedic surgeon, father of Milt McColl
 Milt McColl - former NFL linebacker who became a medical doctor
 Frank Ryan – former NFL player and mathematician, who maintained an academic career while playing in the league
 Myron Rolle – former NFL defensive back who was also a Rhodes scholar and is now serving a neurosurgery residency
 John Urschel – former NFL player and mathematician who was a PhD candidate while playing in the league
 Byron White - former NFL running back who became a US Supreme Court Justice
 Rob Zatechka – former NFL guard who became a medical doctor

References

External links
 
 Sports Reference – college statistics – Dennis Claridge
Huskers.com – 50 Years Later: Q&A with Dennis Claridge 
Husker Max – Dennis Claridge
Dennis Claridge football card

1941 births
2018 deaths
Players of American football from Phoenix, Arizona
Sportspeople from Lincoln, Nebraska
Players of American football from Nebraska
American football quarterbacks
Nebraska Cornhuskers football players
Green Bay Packers players
Atlanta Falcons players
American orthodontists
Deaths from bladder cancer
Deaths from cancer in Nebraska
20th-century dentists